Paddle ball is a one-person toy played with an attached ball and paddle.

Paddle ball or Paddleball may also refer to:

Paddle ball (sport), a sport involving a paddle and a ball
Beach tennis, also known as "beach paddle ball"
Matkot, also known as "Beach paddleball" or "kadima"
Frescobol, a popular Brazilian beach game.
One wall paddleball
Four wall paddleball
Racquetball, which grew out of four wall paddleball and was originally called "paddle rackets"

See also
Racquet sport